Bakmi or bami is a type of wheat based noodles derived from Chinese cooking tradition. It was brought to Indonesia by Chinese immigrants from Southern Chinese provinces like Fujian. It is typically prepared seasoned in soy sauce and topped with pork products, which is often substituted for other protein sources in predominantly Muslim Indonesia. Chinese-style wheat noodles has become one of the most common noodle dishes, especially in Southeast Asian countries which have significant Chinese populations and known by various names.

Chinese-style wheat noodles is known as bakmi in Indonesia, where it has been adapted to more closely align with the local tastes and adapted in Javanese and Indo cuisine. Bakmi is between Chinese style wheat noodles and Japanese udons in thickness, and there are several variants of bakmi in Indonesia. The name bakmi literally translates to "meat noodle", where meat includes chicken and beef.

Origin and history
Bakmi consists of two Hokkien Chinese words, which literally translates to English as "meat noodles". 

Chinese influences is evident in Indonesian food, such as bakmi, mie ayam, pangsit, mie goreng, and kwetiau goreng. The words mie and bami, used in Dutch, come from bakmi and were introduced into the Dutch language during the Dutch colonial period in Indonesia. Indonesian food is very popular in the Netherlands, and bami goreng (fried bakmi) is a popular dish. 

In Thailand, wheat-based egg noodles are known as bami, which  may be ordered as bami nam or bami haeng (egg noodles with soup and without soup respectively), and the noodles may be used in Chinese style stir-fried dishes.

Ingredients
Bakmi or bami is a type of wheat noodle with a slightly pale yellow colour. The most common type of bakmi in Indonesia is mi kuning or 'yellow noodles' made from finely ground wheat, sometimes enriched with eggs as mi telur (egg noodle) made into dough, ground and run through holes to create noodle strings. The traditional way to create bakmi is by pulling the dough several times coated with flour to create the noodle strings, similar to the method to make lamian.

The most common recipe of bakmi dish in Indonesia uses chicken meat as the majority of Indonesians are Muslims. Chicken noodle, mie ayam is wheat noodle topped with diced chicken meat seasoned in soy sauce. Mie ayam often accompanied with wonton either crispy fried or in soup, and also bakso (meatball). Bakmi ayam is a popular Chinese Indonesian dish and ubiquitous in Indonesian cities, it can be served in a restaurant to a humble travelling cart. The other popular Indonesian bakmi recipe is fried bakmi ( or ).

Preparation
Bakmi is normally boiled for serving. When bakmi is intended for use in soup, it is usually boiled separately from the broth. The noodles are usually mixed with animal fats, either from pork, chicken or beef. The noodles are then served with various toppings: an example would include a few slices of char siu (叉燒) or barbecued pork, with addition of Chinese green vegetables and a bowl of broth. 

In Indonesia, the most common toppings are diced seasoned chicken with choy sum and fried wonton skin, to more expensive type using fried or boiled wonton and bakso (meatballs). The soup is served in a different bowl, and is added to the noodles by the individual diner according to taste. Several notable Indonesian dishes developed from the original Chinese wheat noodle tradition includes mie ayam (chicken noodle) and mie goreng (stir fried noodle in sweet soy sauce). I fu mie is bakmi that is first deep fried and then topped with a thickened gravy of vegetables and meat.

Varieties

Indonesian

 Bakmi bangka, a Chinese Indonesian noodle dish from Bangka Island. It is a plate of noodle topped with minced pork, slices of braised pork, mushroom and chopped scallion. The original Chinese Indonesian version uses minced pork, the halal version however, usually uses minced chicken.
 Bakmi siantar, pork noodle from Pematang Siantar town in North Sumatra, usually served with red char siu coloured with angkak. Popular within Batak cuisine, it was derived from, and possibly the most closer version to the traditional Chinese Indonesian bakmi (meat/pork noodle).
 Bakmi ayam, Indonesian Chinese chicken noodles.
 Bakmi goreng, Indonesian Chinese fried noodles, omnipresent in Indonesia.
 Bakmi jawa, from Central and East Java with somewhat wet consistency.
 Bakmi aceh, from Aceh, it has a curry-like flavor.
 Bakmi celor, from Palembang, it has a sweet starchy gravy.
 Bakmi pangsit, generally known from Sumatera area, North Sumatera, Medan, etc.
 Bakmi belitung, from Belitung island, with sweet white sauce.
 Bakmi kangkung, it is composed of noodles, kangkung, bean sprouts, lime juice, mince meat, and broth.

Thailand

 Bami haeng (a dish made with wheat noodles (bami) served "dry" (haeng).
 Bami mu daeng	(), noodle dish with red roast pork.
 Khao soi, Northern Thai curry-soup dish which uses bami noodles.

See also

Kolo mee
Mie ayam
Mie goreng
Mie rebus

References

Indonesian Chinese cuisine
Javanese cuisine
Dutch fusion cuisine
Indonesian noodles
Indonesian noodle dishes
Thai noodle dishes
Mixed noodles